
Broadway at the Beach is a shopping center and entertainment complex located in Myrtle Beach, South Carolina. Broadway at the Beach is owned and operated by Burroughs & Chapin. Broadway at the Beach receives upwards of 14 million visitors annually.

Overview
The complex is divided into several distinct zones named New England Fishing Village, Caribbean Village, Charleston Boardwalk, Heroes Harbor and Celebrity Square, a warehouse district-themed nightclub district that stays open later than the rest of the districts. The complex is home to many attractions, such as the Ripley's Aquarium, Legends In Concert, WonderWorks, Hollywood Wax Museum and the Pavilion Nostalgia Park, which features rides from the former Myrtle Beach Pavilion. The complex contains three hotels, a Hampton Inn located inside the complex, and a Fairfield Inn and Holiday Inn Express located across 29th Avenue North in a section named Lakeshore at Broadway.

The Heroes Harbor zone includes a replica of the Morris Island Light atop a bar.

History
Burroughs & Chapin announced the project in 1993. The July 4, 1995 grand opening included Senator Strom Thurmond and Governor David Beasley. The first attractions included Hard Rock Cafe and Palace Theatre (which once hosted Savage Garden and Weird Al Yankovic). A horseshoe shaped area ran from Celebrity Square to the “Generations at Play” fountain. Additional stores came later, along with Grissom Parkway. Nearby U.S. 17 Bypass attracted more development. In November 1996, a Planet Hollywood and All Star Cafe opened in the "Lakeshore at Broadway" district. The high-profile grand opening of the two restaurants in 1997  attracted celebrities such as Bruce Willis, Jennifer Love Hewitt and Will Smith.

In October 2010, Legends in Concert held its last show in nearby Surfside Beach before moving to the site of Club Kryptonite (which originally housed the All Star Cafe) in 2011. WonderWorks, described as "a science attraction housed in an upside-down building", opened April 4, 2011. On April 1, 2012, Backstage Mirror Maze and The Vault Laser Maze opened. The maze attraction recalls an actual bank robbery in Times Square from the 1930s.

Following Labor Day weekend in 2015, both Planet Hollywood and MagiQuest closed, and the globe-shaped Planet Hollywood building was demolished the following month. Around the same time, several clubs in the Celebrity Square district, including Revolutions and Carlos'n Charlie's announced that they would close in November. Some people living in the area expressed concern that Burroughs & Chapin wanted to drop adult attractions for a more family-oriented development.

On February 3, 2015, changes were announced that included the city's first Dave & Buster's as well as American Tap House and OZ nightclub. A new 15,043-square-foot Hard Rock Cafe opened in 2016. The landmark Hard Rock pyramid was demolished in fall 2016 to make way for the new Dave & Buster's. Additionally, a Wahlburgers location opened in fall 2016, replacing the former Club Rodeo. The former Carlos'n Charlie's restaurant is home to a two-story restaurant called Paula Deen’s Family Kitchen. Malibu’s Surf Bar, Crocodile Rocks, Original Shucker’s Raw Bar and the Carolina Comedy Club would stay where they were. In addition, the Celebrity Square district received a facelift to replace the aging "French Quarter" facade with a more contemporary style reminiscent of a warehouse district. In 2017 Celebrity Square was officially renamed "The Avenue"; all signage referencing Celebrity Square were subsequently removed.

The façade of the 2700-seat Palace Theatre received major damage from Hurricane Matthew in October 2016. Along with water damage, the situation led the city to declare the building "unfit for human occupancy" in January 2017 unless repairs were made. Hurricane Bonnie caused similar damage in 1998, but the theater had been more successful and repairs were still possible.  On April 11, 2017, Chapin Company said the building would be torn down;  the building was demolished starting April 25, 2017.

One of the new attractions for 2018 was the 360 Observation Wheel, a  Ferris Wheel with 36 gondolas that will seat six, and a million lights that can flash along with music. In August 2018, a 4D ride based on The Simpsons opened, housed in a replica of The Aztec theater from the series. Next door, a gift shop modeled after Kwik-E-Mart sells in-series merchandise such as Buzz Cola, Lard Lad Donuts, and Squishees.

It was announced on December 11, 2018, that Broadway Louie's, a sports and karaoke bar, would be closing after 20 years following the venues New Year's Eve bash. No reason was given for the closing of the venue.

On August 8, 2019, after 23 years, the AMC Classic Broadway 16 had its final showings and later closed. It previously operated as a Carmike theater before AMC acquired Carmike. Also, there was an additional theater called the IMAX Theater which later became the Big-D Theater that was operated by Carmike and later AMC. It was demolished a month later in September. 

On March 15, 2021, it was announced that there is a new tenant for the space   previously occupied by Oz nightclub. The Charles Bach Wonders Theatre will be moving into the space and will begin offering three show daily starting on June 4, 2021.

On April 17, 2021, Broadway at the Beach announced the return of weekly firework shows this summer as well as several new merchants. The firework shows will return in June with shows taking  place every Tuesday starting June 8. New merchants include: Byrd's Famous Cookies (a cookie, snack and gift company),  Fresh-Up (a lite bite eatery featuring smoothies, juices, bubble waffles and other treats),  The Broadway Theater (feature Le Grand Cirque as its very first show from May 20 through the end of October. Hot Jersey Nights Christmas Special will be featured in November and December), Retro Active 2. Located next to Build A Bear Workshop (a must-stop shop for the best in pop culture and music from the ’90s through the favorites of today) It'Sugar recently opened a Sour Patch Kids store inside their space for  both sweet and sour candy fans.

Gallery

References

External links 
Burroughs & Chapin Company, Inc.

1996 establishments in South Carolina
Shopping malls in Myrtle Beach, South Carolina
Shopping malls established in 1996
Landmarks in South Carolina
Aquaria in South Carolina